Srđan Predragović (born 4 July 1995) is a Bosnian handball player for Alpla HC Hard and the Bosnian national team.

He represented Bosnia and Herzegovina at the 2020 European Men's Handball Championship.

References

External links

1995 births
Living people
Bosnia and Herzegovina male handball players
Sportspeople from Banja Luka
Expatriate handball players
Bosnia and Herzegovina expatriate sportspeople in Switzerland

Serbs of Bosnia and Herzegovina